Iganmode Cultural festival (also known as Odun  Omo Iganmode) (https://iganmodefestival.org/ ) is an annual festival celebrated by the Awori Yoruba people of the ancient city of Ota in Ogun State, Nigeria.The week long annual festival usually takes place in Decemberof every year, to showcase the cultural, spiritual and mystical heritage of the Ota Awori people.The festival is also a spiritual bugle , a home coming call for a cultural renaissance and re awakening call to all sons and daughters of Awori sub-nationality, in Lagos, Ogun, Osun, Republic of Benin, diaspora and wherever they be may be on the face of earth.

History 
The first edition of the festival was held in 1992 when the festival was then referred to as Iganmode Day. over the years, the festival have hosted many prominent Nigerians and dignitaries, such as former Nigerian president Chief Olusegun Obasanjo, former Nigeria Attorney general and minister of justice the late Chief Bola Ige. others include former governors of Ogun State Chief Olusegun Osoba, Otunba Gbenga Daniel, Ibikunle Amosun and the present Governor and Deputy Governor Prince Dapo Abiodunand Engr. Noimot Salako Oyedele (a native of Ota). Taiwo Ajayi Lycett amongst others . The festival have also been chaired by a number of eminent personalities such as Asiwaju Bola  Tinubu, Sir Kesington Adebukunola Adebutu and Senator Musiliu Obanikoro

Key highlights 
One of the major highlights of the festival is the display by Egungun Masquerades in OtaMasquerade traditions are very sacred to the awori yoruba people of Ota

Tourism 
The festival is been supported by the Ogun State Government. Tthe events of the festival are done with the spiritual and traditional blessings of the Olota of Ota. The festival also seek to promote the tourism potentials of Ota, Ogun State and Nigeria

It allows people to see different cultural displays and visits to tourist locations like the second storey building in Nigeria

References 

Yoruba
Culture
Tourism
Tradition
Traditional African religions
Ogun State
Nigeria